Ipiés is a locality located in the municipality of Sabiñánigo, in Huesca province, Aragon, Spain. As of 2020, it has a population of 10.

Geography 
Ipiés is located 41km north of Huesca.

References

Populated places in the Province of Huesca